Palaver Point is a point on the west side of Two Hummock Island, in the Palmer Archipelago situated 5.07 km northwest of Veyka Point, the south extremity of the island.

The point was photographed by the Falkland Islands and Dependencies Aerial Survey Expedition (FIDASE) in 1955–57. The name arose because the feature is the site of a penguin rookery, with its attendant ceaseless noise resembling the profuse and idle discussion denoted by the word "palaver."

Headlands of the Palmer Archipelago
Two Hummock Island